Makan Kéita (born 16 December 1972) is a Malian footballer. He played in two matches for the Mali national football team in 1993. He was also named in Mali's squad for the 1994 African Cup of Nations tournament.

References

External links
 

1972 births
Living people
Malian footballers
Mali international footballers
1994 African Cup of Nations players
Association football midfielders
People from Ségou Region
21st-century Malian people